Germana Caroli (born Germana Mazzetti on 14 August 1931) is an Italian singer, mainly active in the 1950s.

Life and career 
Born in Bologna, Caroli was noted by the composer and conductor  while she was performing a song in a night club of her hometown. After studying singing, diction and acting, Caroli was entered into the Orchestra Fenati as vocalist, and with them she got a large success with the song "Ehi, tu" (1954), which subsequently launched her solo career.

Caroli had the peak of her career between the late 1950s and the early 1960s, when she participated to the most important Italian musical events of the time, including Canzonissima, Festival di Napoli and the tenth edition of the Sanremo Music Festival.

Discography 

 

     1958 - Magic Moments/Non partir (Durium, Ld A 6394)
     1958 - La pioggia cadrà/Dors mon amour (Durium, Ld A 6395)
     1958 - Parole alla luna/Femminilità (Durium, Ld A 6468)
     1958 - Da te era bello restar/Ehi tu! (Durium, Ld A 6469)
     1959 - Un bacio sulla bocca/Nessuno (Durium, Ld A 6476)
     1959 - Ti prego, amore/Dance darling dance (Durium, Ld A 6510)
     1959 - Petite fleur/D'improvviso (Durium, Ld A 6562)
     1959 - D'improvviso/Venus (Durium, Ld A 6563)
     1959 - Passiuncella/'O destino 'e ll'ate (Durium, Ld A 6570)
     1959 - Rubare/Por dos besos (Durium, Ld A 6730)
     1960 - Gridare di gioia/Amore senza sole (Durium, Ld A 6738)
     1960 - Luna, Lina e brezzolina/Di' la tua (Durium, Ld A 6901)
     1960 - Alle 10 della sera/Diavolo (Durium, Ld A 6953)
     1961 - Le mille bolle blu/Che brivido ragazzi (Durium, Ld A 6976)
     1966 - Sei poco intelligente/Un pezzetto di ghiaccio (Century, AM 006)
     1967 - Forse/La colpa più grande (DKF Folklore, KF 30038)
     1969 - È troppo tardi/Va via (Kansas, dm 1114)
     1981 - Georgia on my mind/Temptation/Stardust (Manhattan Records Man, 45002)

References

External links

1931 births
Musicians from Bologna
Italian pop singers
Italian women singers
Living people